Tomcattin' is the fourth studio album of Southern rock band Blackfoot, released in 1980. The album features Shorty Medlocke, grandfather of band member Rickey Medlocke, on "Fox Chase". While the album did not spawn any hit singles, it was enough to keep the band's devoted fan base loyal and strong, it remains a popular staple in Blackfoot's catalogue.

Track listing 
All songs composed by Rickey Medlocke and Jakson Spires, except where indicated

Side one
"Warped" – 4:12 
"On the Run" – 4:00 
"Dream On" (R. Medlocke, Spires, Greg T. Walker) – 5:16 
"Street Fighter" (Charlie Hargrett, Medlocke, Spires) – 2:34 
"Gimme, Gimme, Gimme" – 4:06

Side two
"Every Man Should Know (Queenie)" – 3:43 
"In the Night" – 3:52 
"Reckless Abandoner" – 5:13 
"Spendin' Cabbage" – 3:15 
"Fox Chase" (R. Medlocke, Shorty Medlocke, Spires) – 4:23

Personnel 
Blackfoot
 Rickey Medlocke – lead vocals, lead, bottleneck, acoustic and 12-string guitars
 Charlie Hargrett – lead guitar
 Greg T. Walker – bass, backing vocals
 Jakson Spires – drums, backing vocals, percussion

Additional musicians
 Shorty Medlocke – harmonica on "Fox Chase"
 Pat McCaffrey – keyboards and saxes
 Henry Weck – percussion
 Donna Davis, Pamela Vincent, Melody McCully – backing vocals
 Peter Ruth – electric harmonica

Production
 Al Nalli – producer
 Henry Weck – producer, engineer
 W.D. Woods II, Andy De Ganhal – mixing assistants
 Greg Calbi – mastering at Sterling Sound, New York

References

External links 
 Blackfoot - Tomcattin' (1980) album review by Eduardo Rivadavia, credits & releases at AllMusic.com
 Blackfoot - ''Tomcattin''' (1980) album releases & credits at Discogs.com
 Blackfoot - ''Tomcattin''' (1980) album to be listened as stream at Spotify.com

1980 albums
Blackfoot (band) albums
Atco Records albums